Frágil is a Peruvian rock band. Named after an eponymous Yes album ("Fragile"), Frágil is one of the most respected rock bands in Perú. Fragil started as a symphonic progressive/hard rock band influenced by the likes of Yes, Genesis, Emerson, Lake & Palmer, Jethro Tull, Black Sabbath, Rainbow . They earned local fame through their hit single "Av. Larco"(Ave. Larco) in the early 80's. Frágil has a cult status in Peru usually selling out all of their concerts.

Band members
 César Bustamante: (Rickenbacker 4001S Bass guitar, 12-string guitar, Peruvian Percussion, Piano, Synthesisers, Korg MS-20, Organ, Mellotron, Arp OMNI, Acoustic Guitar, Keyboards and Backing Vocals)
 Octavio Castillo: Keyboards (Korg MS-20, Ensoniq, Arp OMNI, Piano, Hammond B3), Flute, Bass, Steel guitar, Mandolin, Quena, Ocarina, Peruvian Percussion and Backing Vocals)
 Andrés Dulude: (Vocals, 12 and 6-string Guitars, Acoustic Guitar)
 Jorge Duránd: (Yamaha Drumset, Percussion, Peruvian Percussion and Backing Vocals)
 Luis Valderrama: (Gibson LesPaul Guitar, Mandolin)
 Alex Rojas: lead and backing Vocals.

Former members and freelancers
 Jose Eduardo Coello (Drums, Percussion) (1970–1972)
 Arturo Creamer (Drums 1978-1983)- 1 album recorded
 Harry Antón (Drums 1972-1978 and 1984–1985)- 1 single recorded
 Armando Pattroni (Drums 1986, 2010, 2019)
 Luis Salazar (Guitars 1984-1985)
 Giuliana Villanueva (Lead Vocals 1985-1986)
 Franjo Antich (Vocals 1982)
 Piñín Folgado (Vocals 1984-1985)- 1 single recorded
 Jorge Pardo (Vocals 1994-1995)
 Santino de la Tore (Vocals 1996-1998)- 1 album recorded

Discography
 Av. Larco (Arturo Creamer / Drums and Percussion) (1980)
 La nave blanca / Alrededor - 45 RPM single - (Piñín Folgado, Vocals / Harry Antón, Drums)
 Serranio (1989)
 Frágil (Compilation) (1990) Remastered (2007)
 Cuento Real (1992) Remastered (2007)
 Alunado (Santino de la Torre / Vocals) (1995)
 Sorpresa del Tiempo (Live with the Philharmonic Orchestra of Lima) (2003)

External links 
 www.fragilperu.com Fans Web Site (defunct)
 myspace.com/fragilband
 [ allmusic.com]

Rock en Español music groups
Peruvian rock music groups
Peruvian progressive rock groups
Musea artists